The Communauté de communes d'Yères et Plateaux was located in the Seine-Maritime département of the Normandy region of northern France. It was created in January 2003. It was dissolved in January 2017.

Participants 
The Communauté de communes comprised the following communes:

See also
Communes of the Seine-Maritime department

References 

Yeres et Plateaux